Kazakhstan competed at the 2015 World Aquatics Championships in Kazan, Russia, from 24 July to 9 August 2015.

Open water swimming

Kazakhstan has qualified five swimmers to compete in the open water marathon.

Swimming

Kazakh swimmers have achieved qualifying standards in the following events (up to a maximum of 2 swimmers in each event at the A-standard entry time, and 1 at the B-standard):

Men

Women

Synchronized swimming

Kazakhstan fielded a full squad of twelve synchronized swimmers to compete in each of the following events at the World Championships.

Water polo

Men's tournament

Team roster

Aleksandr Fyodorov
Sergey Gubarev
Alexandr Axenov
Roman Pilipenko
Vladimir Ushakov
Alexey Shmider
Murat Shakenov
Anton Koliadenko
Rustam Ukumanov
Yevgeniy Medvedev
Ravil Manafov
Branko Pekovich
Valeriy Shlemov

Group play

Playoffs

9th–12th place semifinals

Eleventh place game

Women's tournament

Team roster

Alexandra Zharkimbayeva
Aruzhan Yegemberdiyeva
Aizhan Akilbayeva
Anna Turova
Kamila Zakirova
Oxana Tikhonova
Zamira Myrzabekova
Oxana Saichuk
Darya Muravyeva
Darya Roga
Anastassiya Mirshina
Assem Mussarova
Darya Ryzhinskaya

Group play

Playoffs

9th–12th place semifinals

Eleventh place game

References

External links
Swimming Federation of the Republic of Kazakhstan

Nations at the 2015 World Aquatics Championships
2015 in Kazakhstani sport
Kazakhstan at the World Aquatics Championships